Champion Trees in South Africa are individual trees or groves that have been identified as having special significance, and therefore protected under Section 12(1) of the National Forests Act of 1998 by the Department of Agriculture, Forestry and Fisheries.

History 
In 2003, the Department of Agriculture, Forestry and Fisheries initiated the project to identify and grant special status to indigenous and non-indigenous trees in South Africa that meet certain set criteria. From May to July 2003, workshops were held in Gauteng, KwaZulu-Natal and the Western Cape to gain consensus from experts to assist in the identification process of exceptional trees (Champion Trees) that are worthy of special protection throughout South Africa.

The Department of Agriculture, Forestry and Fisheries initiated the Champion Trees Project with the purpose of identifying exceptional trees and regulating for their special protection using the National Forests Act of 1998 (NFA). Section 12 of the National Forests Act states that the Minister of Environment, Forestry and Fisheries can declare certain tree species and individual trees or groups of trees as protected. Under Section 15(1)(a) of the National Forests Act, such protected trees may not be "...cut, disturbed or damaged and their products may not be possessed, sold or transported without a licence...".  In the case of individual trees, the protection is absolute, with no potential for permission for removal except if life or property is threatened (eg. by dying or leaning trees). 

One of the outcomes of the Department’s Champion Trees Project is to gazette a list of Champion trees as part of the National Forests Act.

Criteria for selection of a Champion Tree 
Any person can nominate a tree for selection. Individual trees or groups of trees proposed for Champion status should have the following attributes: 

 Must fit the definition of a tree; 

 Must be living or dying only; 

 Can be indigenous or non-indigenous; 

 May be in protected areas or in botanical gardens;  
 May be listed as protected in other pieces of legislation; and  
 Must be evaluated against a system of categories and criteria to merit Champion status. 

Additional criteria that define a tree's eligibility are biological attributes, the age of the tree, and heritage or historical significance.

Biological attributes 
Champion trees can be designated on a range of singular biological attributes: 

 Diameter

 Height

 Crown spread

The Dendrological Society of South Africa, which maintains the National Register of Big Trees in South Africa, uses a formula of the combination of the three biological attributes to obtain the Size Index (SI):This formula has been implemented to determine a tree's Champion Status.

Tree age 
The National Forests Act recommends that trees considered for Champion Tree status on the basis of age should be at least 120 years old.

Heritage Significance 
This criterion should take into account the particular value associated with the tree, and graded on a scale of 1-10 (>6 is a potential candidate for Champion Tree status): 

 Aesthetic value (image of the tree)

 Landscape value (enhancement of the landscape)

 Historical value (related to a past event or icon)

 Cultural value (of ongoing importance to a cultural group) 

 Economic value (able to generate economic benefits such as through ecotourism)

Designated Champion Trees 
The first tree to be protected under the above criteria was the historic oak tree, the Sophiatown Oak (Quercus robur). As of November 2016, 82 trees were designated Champion Trees.

  - indicates a delisted tree

See also 
 Champion Tree
 List of protected areas of South Africa

Notes

References 

Individual trees in South Africa